XHZN-FM may refer to:

XHZN-FM (Guanajuato) in Celaya, Exa 104.5 FM and 780 AM
XHZN-FM (Michoacán) in Zamora, Los 40 88.1 FM